John Wilson "Jack" Poole,  (April 14, 1933 – October 23, 2009) was a Canadian businessman who, as the head of the VANOC bid committee, was responsible for bringing the 2010 Winter Olympics to Canada.

He died of pancreatic cancer shortly after midnight on October 23, 2009, hours after the Olympic Flame was lit at the beginning of the 2010 Winter Olympics torch relay, in Olympia, Greece.

Professional history 

Poole graduated from the University of Saskatchewan in 1954, with a degree in civil engineering. He subsequently entered the field of real estate development (in which position he hired B.C. Premier Gordon Campbell, then a teenager, as a labourer; Poole later joked that he had given Campbell "his first job", and that by choosing Poole to chair VANOC, Campbell "gave me my last"). Poole co-founded Daon Development Corporation, the second-largest real estate development company in North America until its collapse in the early 1980s recession when it was purchased by Bell Canada Enterprises.

Family 
His father John "Jack" Poole was a grain dealer. He is survived by his second wife Darlene, four daughters, a stepson and his extended family. One of his grandsons, Blake Hawksworth, was a Major League Baseball pitcher. His granddaughter Erin Hawksworth is a reporter.

Honours

Poole was made a member of the Order of British Columbia in 2003, an Officer of the Order of Canada in 2006, and a member of the Order of the Sash by the Metis Nation British Columbia in March 2007.

To honour his work and achievement for the 2010 Winter Olympics and 2010 Winter Paralympics, the former Thurlow Plaza was renamed Jack Poole Plaza in his memory. The external cauldron for the games was chosen to be built at the Jack Poole Plaza as well.

References

Further reading 
 

1933 births
2009 deaths
Deaths from pancreatic cancer
Deaths from cancer in British Columbia
Canadian people of Métis descent
Members of the Order of British Columbia
Officers of the Order of Canada
Businesspeople from Vancouver
University of Saskatchewan alumni
Recipients of the Olympic Order
Indspire Awards